BRN-3 is a group of related transcription factors in the POU family. They are also known as class 4 POU domain homeobox proteins.

There are three BRN-3 proteins encoded by the following genes:

 BRN3A (POU4F1)
 BRN3B (POU4F2)
 BRN3C (POU4F3)

Nomenclature
The BRN or Brn prefix is an abbreviation for "brain"; the longer name is "Brain-specific homeobox". The name of the group may also be abbreviated as POU4, Pou4, POU IV, or POU-IV.

References

External links
 

Transcription factors